Fitzpatrick House is a historic mansion in Mooresville, Tennessee, United States.

History
The mansion was built in 1832 for Morgan Fitzpatrick, a farmer who owned 150 slaves by 1860. His son, Samuel W. Fitzpatrick, served in the Confederate States Army during the American Civil War of 1861–1865, and subsequently inherited the farm. It remained in the Fitzpatrick family, except for a hiatus between 1930 and 1942. The owner from 1942 to 1965, John Paul Fitzpatrick, was "a leading pencil manufacturer with factories in Tennessee, New Jersey, and California." His son took over the business and inherited the house.

Architectural significance
The house was designed in the Federal architectural style. It has been listed on the National Register of Historic Places since August 26, 1982.

References

Houses on the National Register of Historic Places in Tennessee
Federal architecture in Tennessee
Houses completed in 1832
National Register of Historic Places in Marshall County, Tennessee